Cataract is a locality split between the Wollondilly Shire and the City of Wollongong, both in New South Wales, Australia.

Heritage listings 
Cataract has a number of heritage-listed sites, including:

 Cataract Road: Cataract Dam

References

Localities in New South Wales
Wollondilly Shire
City of Wollongong